Peyman Milanfar is a Principal Scientist / Director at Google Research, where he leads the Computational Imaging team. Prior to this, he was a Professor of Electrical Engineering at University of California Santa Cruz, from 1999-2014. He was Associate Dean for Research at the School of Engineering from 2010-12. From 2012-2014 he was on leave at Google-x, where he helped develop the imaging pipeline for Google Glass. Most recently, his team at Google developed the digital zoom pipeline for the Pixel phones, which includes the multi-frame super-resolution "Super Res Zoom" technology, and the RAISR upscaling algorithm. In addition, the Night Sight mode on Pixel 3 uses the Super Res technology (whether zoomed or not) for vivid shots in all lighting conditions. 

His work includes the development of fast and robust methods for super-resolution, statistical analysis of performance limits for inverse problems in imaging, and the development of adaptive non-parametric techniques (kernel regression) for image and video processing. He holds several US patents in the field of image and video processing. 

Milanfar did his undergraduate studies at University of California, Berkeley, graduating in 1988, with a joint degree in Mathematics and Electrical Engineering. Milanfar received his Ph.D. in Electrical Engineering and Computer Sciences from MIT in 1993, with Alan S. Willsky. He was a research scientist at SRI International from 1994 to 1999 before moving to UC Santa Cruz.

Awards and honors
In 2000, Milanfar won a Career award from the US National Science Foundation.
He was elected to IEEE Fellow in 2010 for contributions to inverse problems and super-resolution in imaging. He is a Distinguished Lecturer of the IEEE Signal Processing Society.

Publications
He has published more than 180 peer-reviewed journal and conference articles. He won a best paper award from IEEE in 2011.

Books
Peyman Milanfar, Ed., Super-resolution Imaging, CRC Press, 2010

References

External links
 Peyman Milanfar's professional home page

1966 births
Living people
UC Berkeley College of Engineering alumni
University of California, Santa Cruz faculty
MIT School of Engineering alumni